Bald Hill is a summit in Washington County in the U.S. state of Missouri.

Bald Hill was so named on account of a lack of trees on its summit.

References

Landforms of Washington County, Missouri
Hills of Missouri